Mikhaylovsky District is an administrative and municipal district (raion), one of the twenty-two in Primorsky Krai, Russia. It is located in the southwest of the krai. Its administrative center is the rural locality (a selo) of Mikhaylovka. Population:  The population of Mikhaylovka accounts for 26.6% of the district's total population.

History
The district was formed on January 4, 1926.

Notable residents 

Alexander Kabiskoy (1920–1950), Soviet flying ace, Hero of the Soviet Union, born in Mikhaylovka
Boris Silayev (born 1946 in Lyalichi), Kyrgyz politician

References

Notes

Sources

Districts of Primorsky Krai
States and territories established in 1926
